Élise Paré-Tousignant  (1937 – August 8, 2018) was a Canadian music administrator and music pedagogue. She was employed as a music theory teacher and auditory trainor at Université Laval and then was appointed the Faculty of Arts at Université Laval's first dean in 1985. Paré-Tousignant was the university's vice-rector of human resources and held the role of artistic director of the Domaine Forget that he held from 1993 to 2001.

Biography
Born in Deschambault-Grondines, Quebec in 1937, Paré-Tousignant was the daughter of the parish organist Blandine Naud and the teacher Victor Paré. She graduated from Université Laval with a degree in music in 1958 and obtained a fourth degree in music education from the Ward Institute in Paris.

During the year following her graduation in 1959, Paré-Tousignant had her first role in musical education by being on a school board. She enrolled on the Université Laval music school's teacher training program that had earlier introduced a bachelor's degree in music education. Paré-Tousignant became employed in the Faculty of Music at Université Laval as a teacher of music theory and auditory training for baccalaureate students and was one of the first specialists in music to be employed by a school board. She educated such students as Bernard Labadie and Lyne Fortin, organised concerts with the university choir, took part in the formation of the option to study music at Cégep de Sainte-Foy and established the university's lyrical workshop teaching rhythmic arts offered to bachlor's degree music education students.

In 1985, Paré-Tousignant was appointed the first dean of the Faculty of Arts at Université Laval. She became the university's vice-rector of human resources two years later, their first female vice-rector. Paré-Tousignant was also the chair of the Student Affairs Commission. In 1993, she was appointed artistic director of the Domaine Forget by its board of directors following the death of Françoys Bernier. In 1995, she was one of fifteen commissioners appointed to the Commission for the Estates General on Education by Jean Garon, the Minister of Education for Parti Québécois. She stood down in 2001.

Paré-Tousignant retired from professional work in 1997. In 1992, she began the formation of the l'École de Musique Denys-Arcand. Paré-Tousignant was one of the first 12 individuals to be appointed to the board of directors of the Conseil des arts et des lettres du Québec in August 1993 to work with president Guy Morin, before becoming vice-president of its management committee.

Paré-Tousignant was on the board of directors of various musical organisations, such as the Les Violons du Roy, the Orchestre Symphonique de Québec, the Trident Foundation, the Claude Lavoie Foundation, and the Culture et Patrimoine Deschambault-Grondines, where she had responsibility for their choir. She was a founder member of the Société du Vieux Presbytère that dedicates itself to improving and preserving Deschambault-Grondines's heritage. Paré-Tousignant was a representative for Portneuf region on the board of directors of the Conseil de la culture des régions de Québec et de Chaudière-Appalaches, and was a member of both the Canada Council for the Arts and the Canadian Music Council.

Personal life and legacy
She was married to Bernard Tousignant, and they had five children. She became unwell in July 2018, and died at Hôpital de l'Enfant-Jésus on August 8, 2018. Her memory was honored by a concert of the Domaine Forget on June 29, 2019.

Awards
Paré-Tousignant received various awards and decorations throughout her career. Paré-Tousignant was appointed Chevalier of the Ordre des Palmes académiques in 2003 and Officer of the National Order of Quebec in 2006. Paré-Tousignant was named  in 2015, and was appointed a Member of the Order of Canada in May 2017.

References

External links
 
 

1937 births
2018 deaths
People from Capitale-Nationale
French Quebecers
Université Laval alumni
20th-century Canadian women
21st-century Canadian women
Academic staff of Université Laval
Canadian music educators
Women music educators
Canadian women academics
Chevaliers of the Ordre des Palmes Académiques
Officers of the National Order of Quebec
Members of the Order of Canada